Nastasja Mariana Schunk (born 17 August 2003) is a German tennis player.

Schunk has a career-high singles ranking by the WTA of world No. 143, achieved on 8 August 2022.

Junior career 
On the junior tour, Schunk has a career-high combined ITF junior ranking of world No. 55, achieved in January 2021. She reached her first junior Grand Slam final at the 2021 Wimbledon Championships as an unseeded player, in which she lost to Ane Mintegi del Olmo.

Professional career

2021: WTA Tour debut
Schunk made her WTA Tour main-draw debut at the Stuttgart Open as a qualifier, but lost to Belinda Bencic in the first round.

2022: Grand Slam debut
Schunk made her Grand Slam championships debut at the French Open as a lucky loser after Ana Konjuh withdrew.
She qualified for her second major at the Wimbledon Championships.

Singles performance timeline

Only main-draw results in WTA Tour, Grand Slam tournaments, Fed Cup/Billie Jean King Cup and Olympic Games are included in win–loss records.

Current through the 2022 WTA Tour

ITF Circuit finals

Singles: 4 (2 titles, 2 runner-ups)

Junior Grand Slam finals

Singles: 1 (runner-up)

Record against top 10 players
Schunk's match record against players who have been ranked in the top 10.

  Belinda Bencic 0–1
  Simona Halep 0–1
  Elena Rybakina 0–1

*

References

External links

2003 births
Living people
German female tennis players
Sportspeople from Mainz